The Voice of the Belgians was a bi-monthly clandestine newspaper published by the Belgian National Movement (MNB) during the German occupation in World War II. In total, 41 issues were published.

Publication
The newspaper, founded by Aimé Dandoy and Camille Joset, first appeared in August 1941, carrying the headline "Sometimes beaten, never defeated!". The editorship of the newspaper was changed repeatedly, after first Aimé Dandoy and then Camille Joset were arrested by the Gestapo. Amongst the later editors was Camille-Jean Joset, son of Camille Joset. In February 1944, there were multiple arrests of leading members of the Belgian National Movement and the publication of Voix des Belges was disrupted. When it reappeared in May 1944, it was in a reduced format, renamed La Petite Voix des Belges.

The newspaper continued to be published until liberation in September 1944.

References

1940 establishments in Belgium
1944 disestablishments in Belgium
Belgian resistance publications
Defunct newspapers published in Belgium
French-language newspapers published in Belgium
Newspapers established in 1940
Publications disestablished in 1944
Underground press in World War II